Saare is a village in Elva Parish, Tartu County, Estonia. It has a population of 5 (as of 1 January 2010).

References

Villages in Tartu County